Maria or Marusia Churai (1625–1653) was a semi-mythical Ukrainian Baroque composer, poet, and singer. She has become a recurrent motif in Ukrainian literature and the songs ascribed to her are widely performed in Ukraine.

Very little is known of her life. She was a native of Poltava (then in Crown of the Kingdom of Poland), and is regarded as the author as well as the subject of the well-known Ukrainian folk song "Oi Ne Khody Hrytsiu Tai na Vechornytsi" (Hryts, Don't Go to the Evening Dances) known in the West as the song "Yes, My Darling Daughter".

Influence in literature
The legend about Marusia Churai was formed under the influence of 19th century literary works such as the novel "Marusia, Malorosiiskaia Sapfo" (Marusia, the Littlerussian Sappho) by C. Shakhnovsky (1839). Many writers used the theme of "Hryts" in their works: M. Starytsky's play "Oi Ne Khody, Hrytsiu" (1892), V. Samiylenko's drama "Churaivna" (1894), Olha Kobylianska's novel "V Nediliu Rano Zillia Kopala" (She Gathered Herbs on Sunday Morning 1909), I. Mykytenko's drama "Marusia Churai" (1935), L. Kostenko's novel in verse "Marusia Churai" (1979), and others.

Influence in music
Franz Liszt composed "Ballade d'Ukraine," a piano piece on the theme of commonly associated with the "Hryts" text. 

The song "Oi Ne Khody Hrytsiu" was translated into Polish (1820), Czech (1822), German (1827), French (1830), English (1848) and other languages. However its melody is not of folk origin. It was first documented use was as an arietta from a vaudeville by a Venetian composer Catterino Cavos.

The melody was used in Yes, My Darling Daughter, a 1941 song by Jack Lawrence.

Three other song texts that are attributed to Marusia Churai: "Kotylysia Vozy z Hory" (The Wagons Were Rolling Downhill), "Viyut' Vitry" (Winds Are Blowing) and "Za Svit Staly Kozachenky" (The Kozaks Were Ready to March at Dawn). While the texts of these songs may indeed be authentic, the music is not. All the melodies that are attached to her texts date from the late 18th century.
The text of the Ukrainian folk song "Oi ne khody Hrytsiu" was first published in English translation in London in 1816. A Polish translation first appeared in 1822 in Lviv and a German translation appeared in 1848. Evidence exists to the songs popularity in France (1830s), Czech, Slovak lands, Belgium and the United States where it equally well known was the song "Ikhav kozak za Dunai" (the Cossack rode beyond the Danube; music and words by Semen Klymovsky).

In Classical Music
Israeli musicologist Yakov Soroker states that the end of the first melodic phrase of "Oi ne khody Hrytsiu" (Yes my Darling Daughter) contains a "signature" melody common in Ukrainian songs in general which he calls the "Hryts sequence" and gives a list of hundreds of Ukrainian folk songs from the Carpathians to the Kuban that contain this particular sequence. His estimation, after studying Z. Lysko's collection of 9,077 Ukrainian melodies was that 6% of Ukrainian folk songs contain the sequence.

Other scholars have also addressed the unique character and expressiveness of the Hryts sequence such as Alexander Serov, who stated that "the refrain exudes a spirit of freedom that transports the listener to the steppes and is mixed with the sorrow of some unexpected tragedy." 

Soroker states that the Hryts signature was used by composers: Joseph Haydn (String Quartet no. 20, op. 9, no. 2; String quartet no. 25, op. 17, no 1; The Saviour's Seven last Words on the Cross, the Rondo of the D major Piano Concerto (composed 1795), Andante and variations for piano (1793)), Luigi Boccherini (duet no. 2), Wolfgang A. Mozart (Symphonia concertante K. 364), L. van Beethoven, J. N. Hummel, Carl Maria von Weber, Franz Liszt (Ballade d'Ukraine), Felix Petyrek, Ivan Khandoshkin, and others.

This legendary composer and singer was commemorated on a Ukrainian postage stamp in February 2000.

References

External linkis
 Marusia Churai in Encyclopedia of Ukraine (in English)

1625 births
1653 deaths
Musicians from Poltava
Pseudepigraphy